Al-Mansur Ali II may refer to:

Al-Mansur Ali II, Imam of Yemen, the Zaidi imam of Yemen in the mid-19th century
Al-Mansur Ali II, Sultan of Egypt, the Mamluk sultan (r. 1376–1382)